The 1988–89 season was Manchester City's second consecutive season in the second tier of English football, the Football League Second Division.

Final league table

Results summary

Results
Manchester City's score comes first

Legend

Football League Second Division

Football League Cup

FA Cup

Full Members' Cup

Squad

References

Manchester City F.C. seasons
Man